Perphias Malekano (born 2 February 1986) is a retired Zambian football defender.

References

1986 births
Living people
Zambian footballers
Zambia international footballers
Lusaka Celtic F.C. players
City of Lusaka F.C. players
Association football defenders